Anders Järryd and John McEnroe were the defending champions, and won in the final 6–4, 7–6(2), against Mansour Bahrami and Henri Leconte.

Draw

Final

Group A
Standings are determined by: 1. number of wins; 2. number of matches; 3. in three-players-ties, percentage of sets won, or of games won; 4. steering-committee decision.

Group B
Standings are determined by: 1. number of wins; 2. number of matches; 3. in three-players-ties, percentage of sets won, or of games won; 4. steering-committee decision.

External links
Completed matches

Legends Over 45 Doubles